Science for Peace is organization of scientists, engineers, social scientists  and scholars working together to promote peace worldwide. It was co-founded by mathematical psychologist Anatol Rapoport, and physicist Eric Fawcett, both former professors at the University of Toronto.  It is based in Toronto, Ontario. Some of the activities undertaken include lectures, workshops, administering the Franz Blumenfeld Peace Education Fund, and hosting the biannual Eric Fawcett Memorial Forum.

See also
Peace and conflict studies
Peace Magazine

External links
 Science for Peace website
 History of Science for Peace
Science for Peace archival papers held at the University of Toronto Archives and Records Management Services
Archival papers of University of Toronto professors involved in Science for Peace are held at the University of Toronto Archives and Records Management Services, including Anatol Rapoport, L. Terrell Gardner, and Derek Paul.

Scientific organizations based in Canada